Chen Yulu (born November 1966) is a Chinese economist, educator, author, and politician who has been president of Nankai University since August 2022. He was vice governor of People's Bank of China from October 2015 to August 2022. He has previously held appointments in the Renmin University of China as the president.

He is a visiting professor at Milton S. Eisenhower Foundation and Columbia University. He is vice-president of All-China Youth Federation (ACYF). He is vice-chairman, deputy secretary-general and executive director of  China International Finance Society.

Early life and education 
Chen was born in November 1966, in Gaocheng County of Shijiazhuang, Hebei, with his ancestral home in Chenghai County, Guangdong. His great-great-grandfather was a calligrapher, his great-grandfather was an official in the Qing government. His grandfather Chen Xu was an educator who settled down in British Hong Kong after the Chinese Civil War. His uncle Chen Xiaodong is the former president of Beijing Planetarium, and his another uncle Chen Ju is a professor at Hubei Normal University. After the high school, he joined the PLA Air Force as a soldier. In 1957 when Mao Zedong launched his Anti-Rightist Movement against intellectuals, his father was sent to the May Seventh Cadre Schools to do farm work, in Yangtai Village of Shijiazhuang, capital of Hebei, where he was born.

Chen received a Bachelor of Economics with a major in finance in 1987, a Master of Economics in international finance in 1989, and a Doctor of Economics in finance in 1998, all from the Renmin University of China.

Career 
After his graduate studies, he taught at Remin University between 1989 and 2010, what he was promoted to Associate Professor in February 1993 and to full Professor in May 1997. He served as Executive Vice-Dean of its Finance College in 1997, and five years later promoted to the Dean position. In May 2005 he was promoted to become its vice-president, he remained in that position until March 2010, when he was transferred to Beijing Foreign Studies University (BFSU) and appointed the president. After a year and half, he was transferred back to Renmin University and served as the president there, a position at vice-ministerial level. In late October, 2015, the Organization Department of the Communist Party of China appointed him as deputy governor of People's Bank of China, China's central bank. He is also an adviser to the China Finance 40 Forum (CF40). In August 2022, he was appointed president of Nankai University, succeeding Cao Xuetao.

Selected publications

Books

Academic papers

References

1966 births
Politicians from Shijiazhuang
Living people
People's Republic of China economists
Educators from Hebei
Writers from Hebei
Renmin University of China alumni
People's Republic of China politicians from Hebei
Chinese Communist Party politicians from Hebei
People's Republic of China essayists
Presidents of Renmin University of China
Presidents of Beijing Foreign Studies University
Economists from Hebei